Panlefkadios F.C. is a Greek football club, based in Kalamitsi, Lefkada, Greece

Honors

Domestic Titles and honors

 Preveza-Lefkada FCA Champions: 1
 2016-17
 Preveza-Lefkada FCA Super Cup Winners: 1
 2016-17

References

Football clubs in the Ionian Islands (region)
Lefkada
Association football clubs established in 2013
2013 establishments in Greece
Gamma Ethniki clubs